() is the official name of Poland and a traditional name for some of its predecessor states. It is a compound of  "thing, matter" and  "common", a calque of Latin rés pública ( "thing" +  "public, common"), i.e. republic, in English also rendered as commonwealth (historic) and republic (current).

The phrase Rzecz Pospolita Ukrainska was used in obituary to the Bohdan Khmelnytsky burial in 1657.

Origins
The term  has been used in Poland since the beginning of the 16th century. It was adapted for Poland, as it at that time had a unique republican system, similar to the former Roman . The famous quote by Jan Zamoyski, the Lord Chancellor of the Crown, on the importance of education is an example of its use:

Although the first  was an elective monarchy, the king had no real power, as most of the state affairs were regulated by the parliament and senate, known as the Sejm.

The three 
 is also used in a series of symbolic names referring to three periods in the history of Poland:
  (sometimes translated as the "First Polish Republic"), in reference to the Polish–Lithuanian Commonwealth (1569–1795). This political system is known as the Golden Liberty. It began with the Union of Lublin in 1569 and ended with the third and final Partition of Poland in 1795. Sometimes the term  is used in reference to the country before the Union of Lublin too, because the  started limiting king's autocracy starting in the early 1500s. The Constitution of 3 May 1791 established a common state, the Rzeczpospolita Polska (Polish Commonwealth), however the Reciprocal Guarantee of Two Nations was adopted on 20 October 1791 by the Great Sejm and modified the changes by stressing the continuity of binational status of the state.
 , in reference to the Second Polish Republic (1918–1939). Used to refer to the interwar period, lasting from the regaining of independence in 1918 following the end of World War I up to the World War II-triggering invasion of Poland in 1939 by both Nazi Germany and the Soviet Union. The renascent Polish State was initially called the Republic of Poland. The title  was introduced by the March Constitution of Poland, the first article of which stated that , meaning "the Polish State is a Commonwealth".
 , in reference to the current Third Polish Republic (1990–present). This is the title of the present-day Polish state, dating from the fall of the Polish People's Republic (a satellite state of the Soviet Union) and the reintroduction of democratic elections in Poland – the 1990 local government elections (27 May 1990) were the first free elections in Poland after World War II.

Other usage
Expressions that make use the concept of  include:
  – The Commonwealth of the Both Nations, another name for the Polish–Lithuanian Commonwealth;
  – Babin Republic, a satirical literary society, founded by a group of nobles during the second half of the 16th century;
  – Free City of Kraków or Republic of Kraków (1815–1846);
  – Republic of Zakopane, a short-lasting form of an independent state, established for about a month in October 1918;
  – People's Republic of Poland, a name used formally from 1952 to 1990; was often abbreviated to simply  or PRL. Sometimes refers (wrongly) to the post-war period 1944–1952.
  – Fourth Polish Republic, a slogan used by the political party Law and Justice.

The Lithuanian word  is a direct borrowing from Polish. The East Slavic equivalents of the name are: ; ; .

See also 

 History of Poland
 Name of Poland
 Outline of Poland

Notes

References

Sources

External links 

 Commonwealth of Diverse Cultures: Poland's Heritage

Country name etymology
Government of Poland